Podhojni Hrib is a settlement immediately north of Rob in the Municipality of Velike Lašče in central Slovenia. The entire municipality is part of the traditional region of Lower Carniola and is now included in the Central Slovenia Statistical Region.

References

External links

Podhojni Hrib on Geopedia

Populated places in the Municipality of Velike Lašče